Tunanmarca, Tunan Marca or Siquillapucara is an archaeological site in Peru. It is located in the Junín Region, Jauja Province, Tunan Marca District. The site was declared a National Cultural Heritage by Resolución Directoral Nacional No. 1359/INC on November 9, 2000.

Commemorative Coin 
On 26 Nov 2013 the Central Reserve Bank of Peru issued 10,000 new 1 Nuevo Sol coin featuring Tunanmarca buildings and including the engraving 1 NUEVO SOL TUNANMARCA S. XIII - XVI d.c.. The coin was part of a series named  the Wealth and Pride of Peru Series.

See also 
 Hatunmarka

References 

Archaeological sites in Peru
Archaeological sites in Junín Region